Scotch College (informally known as Scotch or SC), is an independent Uniting Church primary and secondary school for boys, located in the Perth suburb of Swanbourne, Western Australia. It has both day and boarding students.

Founded in 1897 by the Presbyterian Church of Australia, the school caters for approximately 1,900 boys from early learning, through pre-kindergarten to Year 12. The school has undertaken the International Baccalaureate's Primary Years and Middle Years programmes since 2003; and offers the Diploma Program for year 11 and 12 students. The school continues to run the state education WACE course and VET (Vocational Education Training).

The school is a member of the Public Schools Association (PSA), the Junior School Heads Association of Australia, and is a member of Round Square Schools.

Scotch College spreads over a large campus in Swanbourne. It also has an outdoor education centre in Dwellingup. The campus in Swanbourne consists of a senior school for years 9 to 12, a junior school for early learning pre-kindergarten to Year 5, and middle school for years 6 to 8. Also located on campus are playing fields spanning 15 hectares, and boarding facilities for 160 students.

History

Foundation

Scotch College owes its foundations to a conversation at an 1896 dinner party, where the parent of a 12-year-old boy, Jane Alexander, wife of William Alexander, MLC, complained that there was an absence of a Presbyterian school for boys in Perth. She offered David Ross, moderator of the Presbyterian Church in Western Australia, £500 to establish Scotch College. The announcement of the college came on Monday 4 January 1897, in the form of an advertisement. The advertisement included the first location of the school, Shearer Memorial Hall, which is now the Perth Trades Hall. When founded, the school was originally named The Alexander Scotch College. The school would later shorten its name to Scotch College in 1908 for banking purposes.

In 1905, the college became a founding school of the Public Schools Association, showing it to be by that time a well regarded independent school, and entitling it to take part in the most competitive schoolboy sporting competition in Western Australia.

World War One to World War Two

During World War I, 475 boys enlisted to defend the empire as part of the Allied forces. This number represented over 50% of all Scotch alumni at the time. A roll of honour is present in Collegians House, the current administration building, featuring the names of all past Scotch College boys who had volunteered to fight.

In 1939, the Head Masters' Conference approached the Commonwealth Government for financial assistance due to low staff salaries, the standard of the school's science facilities and the lack of money the school possessed. When gifts of money to the school became tax deductible in 1954 (provided donations were for the purpose of either repaying debt on buildings or helping to fund new building projects), people found they had more incentive to donate to schools. This led to Scotch, among other schools around Australia, beginning fundraising appeals within the school community.

Post war
Even before donations were made tax deductible, an appeal to fund a memorial for past boys who served in the Second World War raised £9,000 by 1950. When the school's council, the town in which Scotch resides in, inquired about the cost for a memorial hall to sit 650 people, they were shocked to discover it would cost around £30,000. A fete organised in 1953 raised £2,500. Another fete was arranged and appeals to both past students and parents increased the total raised to £17,500. Despite lack of funds, David Brisbane, a council member since 1945, laid the foundation stone for the hall in early 1957. Although donations to schools over £1 had been tax-deductible since 1954, it was not until January 1957 that the Taxation Department informed the school that all donations towards the new Scotch College Building Fund would be tax-deductible. The appeal committee launched a major appeal raising £23,000 for the Memorial Hall.

The Memorial Hall was opened by Sir Charles Gairdner, Governor of Western Australia at the time, on 19 October 1957, the same year as the school's Diamond Jubilee. The opening led to a further £30,000 in promised donations, although the actual amount received was below this figure. Eventually the cost of the hall led to the school having to be provided a £25,000 overdraft from the ASB Bank; this led to an increase in school fees. The total cost of the Memorial Hall was £48,864 and the appeal raised £45,700. Gordon Gooch, who has a sports pavilion at the school named after him, met the shortfall.

1970 to 1990
In 1971, after observing the May 1968 French riots, a group of Year 12 boys organised a "schoolboy strike" on the regulations of hair length, after the issue had been simmering for several months. The strike involved 60 boys refusing to return to class after the lunch bell, despite threat of expulsion, which led the headmaster to arrange an assembly for all boys after having a psycho. The ringleader of the strike, Cary Kallis informed the Nine Network newsroom to announce the strike. However, Kallis informed several boys which led to news of the strike quickly spreading around the school. After being threatened by a teacher with expulsion, Kallis quickly called Channel Nine again, pretending to be a teacher, by saying "The strike has been cancelled and the boys have been disciplined". As mentioned above, the strike still went ahead.

In 1984, Scotch acquired Moray, the school's outdoor education centre where students would be able to attend camps. This was purchased after the school had considered, for over a decade, the possibility of acquiring a site for a school camp. The Parents' Association gave support to the project and the school purchased the  property through a mortgagee sale for $220,000. It was named Moray after a province in Scotland where Clan Murray originated (the Moray camp site is adjacent to the Murray River).

The Scotch College foundation was established in 1986, when Judge Robert Keall was chairman of the college. The foundation raised $1.1 million within six months to partly fund a new Physical Education Centre. Robert Keall opened the $2.25 million centre on 29 March 1988.

1990 on

In 2007, the school built the Dickinson Centre, named after Scotch's previous headmaster, the late W. R. Dickinson, for assemblies and other functions. In June 2009, the school opened a Science, Design and Technology building next to the school chapel. Designed by Taylor Robinson architects, the new facility marks the completion of the first stage of the school's Master Plan. A memorial service was held for the late W. R. Dickinson, the fifth headmaster of Scotch College, on 10 May 2006. A pavilion was erected on the Scotch playing fields, and the School and Pipe Band formed a guard of honour for the Dickinson family members and the funeral cortege as they arrived. In 2015, a new middle school campus was opened along with library facilities and gallery. Memorial Hall was refurbished in 2017 with a new Heritage Centre that houses the school's archival collection. In February 2019, the school's PC Anderson Chapel was refurbished and rededicated with the appointment of two new college chaplains.

In May 2017, Scotch College announced the banning of phones on campus during school. This decision was made to remove lunchtime distractions and encourage more face to face discussions among the students.

Schools

Scotch College has many schools and facilities.
The brand new School of Mathematics and Commerce. This is the newest addition to the school.
School of Design, Technology and Sciences. Built in 2011, this building houses facilities for production of handmades. The building also houses the school's science department. The building has many design flaws which include no natural light in many spaces of the building.
Department of Humanities and Social Sciences.
Department of Language Acquisition. The school offers studies in French, Indonesian and Spanish.
Department of Performing Arts
Department of Media and Visual Arts
Department of Language and Literature
Department of Physical Education

Student facilities

Student resource centres have a number of different facilities available, which include IT assistance, equipment hire, proofreading and late night study as well as a number of online resources. Compared to other departments in the school, the library has an incredibly large budget. This allows students to purchase reading material and academic journals at any time. The large budget also allows for the further development and initiatives within the libraries.

The college has an academic support department which provides assistance to students in the classroom and during exams.

Headmasters

Curriculum
Scotch offers a wide range of subjects in its academic curriculum. All students in years 8 to 10 study one language other than English – either French or Indonesian – through the International Baccalaureate's Middle Years Programme (MYP). In Year 8, boys undertake a community project.

Scotch awards several scholarships based on academic merit to students, but under agreed PSA rules no member schools may award sports scholarships. Entrance scholarships at Scotch are based on the results of scholarship examinations. In Year 11 there are two scholarships open to sons of former alumni (PC Anderson Memorial Old Boy's Scholarship) as well as the WR Dickinson Scholarship. To be considered, boys must have several references and nominations from the staff and are required to sit an interview and submit a copy of their resume.

Middle school structure
From 2003, when the school became an International Baccalaureate certified school, students began to study two languages, a maths,  a science, an art, a technology, and a humanities and physical education subject.

Boys in years 9 and 10 have the option of choosing which technology and arts classes they take for either the year or semester. They may also take drama and music. Technology includes metal work, wood work, electronics, information systems and 3D modelling.

Senior school curriculum

Scotch offers the IB Diploma Programme to senior students in years 11 and 12. In addition to this, students in years 11 and 12 have the option of undertaking WACE or VET. The top student for each subject is awarded a prize on speech night, and the Year 12 student who finishes top of their year in their chosen pathway is awarded dux.

In 2017, two Scotch students achieved 45, a perfect score for the IB Diploma. In that same year, a WACE student achieved an ATAR score of 99.95.

In 2005, a Scotch graduate received the Beazley Medal, which is awarded to the top student in the state, for his TEE results. As in 2004, two students were awarded General Exhibitions. Subject Exhibitions were awarded to three students for five overall subjects.

Academics
The school appears regularly in the top 50 schools for the Western Australian Certificate of Education.

Scotch student life
Scotch offers a comprehensive extracurricular activities program for students. The school has boarding facilities for students who live in rural areas of Western Australia, as well as international students. The major components of the program are sport, music, the arts and community and service. Students in years 10–12 may participate in FESA Cadet programs. Activities offered: Cadets, Chess, Debating, Instep, UNYA, Duke of Edinburgh, SMARTS, Prometheans, Drama, Music and Pipe Band.

Boarding
All boarding students live in residential houses, with boarding staff who also live on site. Boarders have 24-hour access to medical services. In 2006, international students were required to pay an extra $5,700 in lieu of government subsidies and extra administration costs.

On weekends boarders will often do a variety of activities that staff arrange. They also use the nearby Indian Ocean as well as Challenge Stadium and Subiaco Oval. Boarders in years 10, 11 and 12 will also participate in sport on a Saturday morning.

A boarding tradition at Scotch is walking the entire Bibbulmun Track. Boys walk sections of the track each year.

Moray
In year 5 and years 7,8, 9 and 10 in the senior school, students will camp for several days, depending on their age, at Moray near Dwellingup. Moray, close to the Murray River, is set in Australian bush and is 66 hectares. Moray allows students to camp either outside in tents, under swags, or inside cabins. Students here will learn about safety, the ecosystems and how native Aboriginal Australians lived in the area. They will also learn how to be more independent by cooking their own food and setting up their own swag. Students will also do activities on the Murray River such as kayaking or canoeing, climbing an outdoor rock wall, climbing a telephone pole, and doing a suspended ropes course. The amount and difficulty of the activities available will increase as the years progress.

The cadets also use Moray for a weekend camp. The cadets do activities, like navigation designed to improve self-confidence like the rock wall or the leap of faith were cadets jump from a telephone pole and try and grab a plastic wire. They are suspended from falling using a wire. One night over the weekend the cadets do a "night stalker" game where the senior cadets try and prevent the junior cadets from reaching a certain point.

House system
The pastoral care system is based on a house structure which deals with all matters relating to a student's well-being or curriculum needs. Each student is placed in a house tutorial group that is overseen by a house tutor for each of the ten houses in senior school.

In junior school however, there are only six houses and had nearly nothing to do with pastoral care. The ten houses listed below belong to the senior school whilst these six houses: Andrew (green), Bruce (orange), David (black), Gordon (yellow), James (blue) and Robert (red) will not be listed below. 

Most house tutorial groups have three students from each year level in that house. A house contains students from years 9 to 12. Each house is led by one head of house. The members of each house are led by a house captain, appointed by the head of house and the students in it. The houses meet on a regular basis. Prior to year 9, students are also placed in houses although the system isn't as involved.

The house tutor and heads of house work as a team to monitor the academic and personal progress of each student in the house tutorial group and house. Generally, the house tutor is the first and main point of contact between the parent and the school. For more serious issues a head of house is usually contacted.

Students are either put in a randomly selected house or into the house of any alumni they are related to. Houses compete against each other in sports such as inter-house athletics and academic contests like debating. Students march to assembly on Friday mornings in their house and are marked on their performance.

The house that wins the most points over all inter-house competitions is awarded the staff trophy. This includes the larger inter-house events like athletics, cross-country and swimming as well as some smaller competitions like lightning chess and indoor soccer.

Sport
Scotch College teams regularly compete in the PSA sports competitions. The students of the college play or compete in association football, athletics, Australian rules football, badminton, basketball, chess, cricket, cross country, golf, field hockey, rowing (see Head of the River), rugby union, sailing, surfing, swimming, tennis, water polo and volleyball. A single year consists of two separate sporting seasons, winter and summer, which have sports unique to them. Winter has of four sports, five after year 10, while summer has a much larger amount that varies as the time in school progresses.
 
Scotch has regularly won the sought after Alcock Shield for PSA athletics, alongside the Dickinson Shield in water polo, the Blackwood Cup in basketball, and the Corr Cup in tennis. Alongside this, the sailing team won the Western Australian State Championships for sailing. In 2013, Scotch had a successful sporting year, winning the Alcock Shield for PSA athletics, for the 3rd year straight, a feat only achieved once before in the school's history. Scotch, led by its captain and triple best and fairest winner Jack Prendiville, also won the Alcock Cup for the PSA football competition outright for the first time in 23 years. Scotch soccer was also able to win the Lawe Davis Cup in 2013.

Each year, tours are arranged for sports teams. Recent tours included the Australian rules football team visiting Melbourne, hockey and cricket tours of South Africa and rugby tour to Fiji. Athletics, cross country and swimming are all major inter-house games and almost every student competes.

PSA premierships 
Scotch has won the following PSA premierships.

 Athletics (19) - 1948, 1954, 1959, 1960, 1961, 1962, 1963, 1964, 1983, 1984, 1996, 1998, 2013, 2015, 2016, 2018, 2019, 2021, 2022
 Badminton - 2016
 Basketball (5) - 2001, 2011, 2012, 2018, 2019
 Cricket (21) - 1908, 1912, 1913, 1914, 1918, 1923, 1924, 1929, 1930, 1932, 1939, 1949, 1952, 1954, 1960, 1970, 1974, 1978, 1996, 2012, 2014
 Football (24) - 1906, 1917, 1925, 1948, 1950, 1951, 1955, 1959, 1960, 1961, 1962, 1964, 1965, 1969, 1970, 1979, 1986, 1987, 1988, 1989, 1990, 1997, 2013, 2016, 2020, 2021, 2022
 Golf (2) - 2005, 2016
 Hockey (15) - 1961, 1983, 1991, 1995, 1997, 1998, 1999, 2000, 2001, 2003, 2004, 2005, 2006, 2008, 2015
 Rowing (5) - 1906, 1907, 1908, 1913, 1920, 1932, 1934, 1935, 1936, 1937, 1938, 1940, 1941, 1957, 1960, 1978, 1984, 1985, 1990, 2006, 2009, 2014, 2015, 2021, 
 Rugby (15) - 1963, 1967, 1968, 1976, 1977, 1978, 1979, 1983, 1989, 1990, 2001, 2015, 2016, 2017, 2018, 2020
 Soccer (5) - 1996, 2003, 2013, 2017, 2018
 Surfing (7) - 2003, 2004, 2008, 2009, 2013, 2015, 2018
 Swimming (23) - 1906, 1907, 1908, 1909, 1912, 1913, 1914, 1915, 1917, 1918, 1921, 1927, 1928, 1929, 1930, 1947, 1948, 1949, 1950, 1953, 1955, 1957, 1985
 Tennis (8) - 1983, 2000, 2007, 2008, 2010, 2011, 2012, 2017
 Water Polo (6) - 1999, 2000, 2002, 2003, 2011, 2017

Arts
Scotch offers students an opportunity to participate in the annual school production. Productions have included Bugsy Malone, Grease, A Clockwork Orange, Blood Brothers, Holes, Charlie and the Chocolate Factory, Mad Forest, Babe the Sheep Pig, One Flew Over the Cuckoo's Nest, Great Expectations, The Addams Family, The Wedding Singer, The Government Inspector and We Will Rock You.

Scotch has two poetry prizes awarded each year; the Raven Senior Poetry Prize for years 11 and 12 and the Raven Junior Poetry Prize for years 8, 9 and 10. The winning piece along with several other pieces of student poetry and art are published in the annual school publication, Reporter. Raven prize winners are presented an award on speech night. There are also two annual prose prizes; the Raven Senior Prose Prize and the Raven Junior Prose Prize. Like the poetry prizes, the winning pieces are published in Reporter and the writer presented with an award on speech night.

Music

Scotch gives students the chance to learn instruments during class time in the senior school. Students may also join the pipe band if their playing skills and marching skills are of a high standard. The pipe band traditionally leads the school in marching.

In recent years there have been several pipe band and music tours. In April 2006, the pipe band toured the United States. The band played in the Virginia International Tattoo in that period It was the pipe band's fourth international tour and its second time participating in an international tattoo of that magnitude. The first was the Nova Scotia Tattoo in 2000. In 2015 and 2018, the pipe band was invited to perform at the Royal Edinburgh Military Tattoo, and the Basel Tattoo in 2019.

All students in the senior school are eligible to play in the school's bands. The school's music bands include Jazz Band, String Orchestra, Big Band 1 (guitar, drums, brass), Big Band 2 (guitar, drums, brass), Big Band 3 (guitar, drums, brass), Middle School Concert Band (years 6 to 10), Chamber Strings, Concert Band (brass and drums), Wind Ensemble (with Presbyterian Ladies' College), Vocal Ensemble, Brass Ensemble and Guitar Ensemble.

The school offers several music scholarships for students in year 7.

The school song is "God of Our Fathers" which is to the tune of "Highland Cathedral". The song is sung at the first and last assembly each term and the music is performed by two pipers and a snare drummer from the pipe band, along with a small brass support band.

Cross-campus classes 
As part of efforts to reduce costs and increase efficiency, Scotch College runs "cross campus" classes with Presbyterian Ladies' College, Perth - their sister school. Shuttle buses operate between the two campuses every hour. These services along with the initiative provide students in Year 11s and 12 to further their education - by choosing subjects that interest them which may not be offered on campus due to budgetary constraints. The cross campus classes are particularly important for students studying for the IB Diploma. Money saved from the initiative is used to further the school's infrastructure - both academic buildings as well as sports pavilions and administrative buildings.

Notable alumni

Alumni of Scotch College are known as Old Scotch Collegians.

Academia and science
 Akshay Venkatesh – mathematician, Stanford University, Fields Medallist

Rhodes Scholars
1922 Sir Walter Worboys (1900–1969)
1998 James Edelman

Arts and media
 Michael Charlton – ABC-TV journalist
 Tony Charlton – TV sports commentator
 Nicholas Hasluck – novelist, poet and short story writer; chair of Commonwealth Writers Prize see also Politics and law
 Gareth McGrillen – musician, Pendulum and Knife Party
 Toby Schmitz – Australian actor and writer
 Rob Swire – musician, Pendulum and Knife Party

Business
 Charles Bunning (1905–1994) – Chair, Bunning Timber Holdings (now Bunnings Group)
 Sir Colin Syme (1903–1986) – Chair, BHP

Education
 John Inverarity – educator, headmaster of Hale School see sport
 Ralph Townsend – educator, headmaster of Sydney Grammar School, Oundle School and Winchester College

Military
 Sir Peter Drummond DSO & Bar, MC, MIDs (1894–1945) – Air Marshall, Royal Air Force
 Eric Lacy Vowles – commandant of the Royal Military College, Duntroon

Politics and law
 Roger Cook – Deputy Premier of Western Australia
 John Dawkins – Federal Treasurer in the Keating Government
 James Edelman – justice of High Court of Australia, Federal Court of Australia, & Supreme Court of Western Australia
 Nicholas Hasluck – justice of Supreme Court of Western Australia
 David Sadleir – Australian Ambassador to China at the time of the Tiananmen Square massacre

Sport
 Bailey Banfield – Australian Rules footballer
 Drew Banfield – Australian Rules Footballer
 Jamie Beadsworth – Australian waterpolo player
 Geoff Boyce – Australian hockey player
 Michael Boyce – Australian hockey player. World Cup Silver Medal in 2006.
 James Brayshaw- cricketer
 Mark Brayshaw - footballer
 Mal Brown – Australian Rules footballer
 Jonathon Charlesworth – Australian hockey player
 Mitch Clarke, basketball player with Perth Wildcats
 James Clement-AFL footballer
 Peter Evans – Olympic Gold medallist in swimming
 Mark Gale – Australian Rules footballer with Fremantle and St Kilda
 Terry Gale – golfer
 Shawn Gillies – cricketer
 Ross Glendinning – former Australian Rules footballer and Brownlow Medalist
 Cameron Green - Australian All-rounder test cricketer
 John Inverarity – Australian Test cricketer
 Rowan Jones – Australian Rules footballer. 2006 AFL Premiership winning player for the West Coast Eagles
 Matthew Kelly – cricketer
 Don Langsford – Australian Rules footballer
 Tom Ledger – Australian Rules footballer with St Kilda
 Tom Lee – Australian Rules footballer
 Luc Longley – former NBA and Australian Boomers basketballer – 3 x NBA Champion with the Chicago Bulls. Current assistant coach with the Australian Boomers. 
 Ashley McIntosh – Australian Rules footballer. 2 x AFL Premiership player for the West Coast Eagles in 1992 and 1994.
 Alistair Nicholson – Australian Rules footballer
 Joel Paris – cricketer
 Mark Seaby – Australian Rules footballer. 2006 AFL Premiership winning player for the West Coast Eagles
 Barry Shepherd – test cricketer; state hockey player and cricket administrator
 John Welborn – rugby union footballer; first Western Australian to play for the Australian Wallabies
 John Winter – high jumper; won Australia's first gold medal at the London Olympics in 1948
 Tristram Woodhouse – Australian hockey player

See also 

 List of schools in the Perth metropolitan area
 List of boarding schools in Australia
 List of pipe bands

References

External links

Scotch College Perth web site
Listen to the Highland Cathedral tune

 
Junior School Heads Association of Australia Member Schools in Western Australia
Boarding schools in Western Australia
Educational institutions established in 1897
International Baccalaureate schools in Australia
Presbyterian schools in Australia
Public Schools Association (Western Australia)
Uniting Church schools in Australia
Member schools of the Headmasters' and Headmistresses' Conference
Boys' schools in Western Australia
Private secondary schools in Perth, Western Australia
Scottish-Australian culture
Private primary schools in Perth, Western Australia
Swanbourne, Western Australia
1897 establishments in Australia